Anthony Lyveden is a 1921 adventure novel by the English author Dornford Yates (Cecil William Mercer). It was first published in monthly instalments in The Windsor Magazine. The book was Mercer's first attempt at a full-length novel, and was succeeded by Valerie French which continued the story of the main characters.

Plot 
Anthony Lyveden DSO, a destitute ex-officer, is forced to take a job as a footman at the Gramarye estate. The estate's owner, Colonel Winchester, becomes mad and leaves Lyveden in charge under a power of attorney. The situation drives Lyveden himself to madness.

Background 

The author was not a happy man at the time, his father having committed suicide early in 1921, and Mercer's biographer AJ Smithers reports a suggestion that at this date he was not far from suffering a nervous breakdown. He defied The Windsor Magazine'''s tradition that every episode should end with a lovers' meeting, though he was pressed hard by the magazine's editor.

 Chapters  

 Illustrations 

The illustrations from the Windsor stories by Norah Schlegel (1879-1963) were not included in the book version.

 Critical reception 
Smithers considered Anthony Lyveden to be a book of varying quality, and too episodic to be truly called a novel. He criticised the characterisations, suggesting that a reader might with some justice think the hero a pompous prig, one of the young women a humourless, suspicious creature, and the other a trollop manquée. 

The original dustjacket included the following quote from the Glasgow Citizen'' -

 "There is no man writing to-day who manages to infuse a story with so much wit of the airy, bantering kind, and behind it all there is often a serious note. Not only that, but when Mr Yates pauses in his stream of witty things, pauses but for a moment to describe a scene or a woman, in a few sentences he paints such a picture that the lover of fine phrases and words must need go over it again for the sheer joy of reading it."

References

Bibliography
 

1921 British novels
Ward, Lock & Co. books
Novels by Dornford Yates